Alle gegen alle is the third album by the German Punk rock band Slime, released in 1983.

Track listing
 "Linke Spiesser" (Left Squares) – 2:07
 "Störtebecker" – 2:12
 "Untergang" (Downfall) – 2:31
 "Zu kalt" (Too Cold) – 2:50
 "Ihr seid schön" (You're So Nice) – 2:59
 "Religion" – 3:16
 "Nazis raus" (Nazis Out) (Betoncombo cover) – 2:12
 "Sand im Getriebe" (Sand in the Transmission) – 2:09
 "Alle gegen Alle" (Everybody vs. Everybody) – 3:02
 "Etikette tötet" (Etiquette Kills) – 3:20
 "Ich will nicht werden" (I don't want to become) (Ton Steine Scherben cover) – 3:22
 "Tod" (Death) – 1:52
 "Junge, Junge" (Boy, oh Boy) (Buddy Holly cover) – 1:42
 "Guter Rat ist teuer" (Good advice is pricey) – 2:39

1983 albums
Slime (band) albums
Albums produced by Harris Johns